Formate dehydrogenases are enzymes that catalyse the oxidation of formate to carbon dioxide.

Formate dehydrogenase may also refer to:

 Formate dehydrogenase (acceptor)
 Formate dehydrogenase (cytochrome)
 Formate dehydrogenase (cytochrome-c-553)
 Formate dehydrogenase (NADP+)

See also
 Formate dehydrogenase-N

 Biology disambiguation pages